Cedar Grove is an unincorporated community in Laurens County, in the U.S. state of Georgia.

History
The Georgia General Assembly incorporated the place as the "Town of Cedar Grove" in 1908. The community was named for a grove of cedar trees near the original town site. The town's charter was formally dissolved in 1918.

References

Unincorporated communities in Laurens County, Georgia
Unincorporated communities in Georgia (U.S. state)